The 2015 Wimbledon Championships Men's Singles final was the championship tennis match of the Men's Singles tournament at the 2015 Wimbledon Championships.

A significant part of the Djokovic–Federer rivalry, it pitted defending champion Novak Djokovic and Roger Federer against each other in a Grand Slam final for the third time, a rematch of the Wimbledon final a year earlier in which Djokovic defeated Federer in five sets. Before the match, Federer led the head-to-head 20 matches to 19, with the two players tied one to one on grass and one to one in Grand Slam finals.

This was the first time the top two seeds had met in a men's Grand Slam final since the 2014 French Open, which pitted Rafael Nadal (1) against Djokovic (2).

Background
Federer, a winner of 17 Grand Slams, was appearing in his 26th Grand Slam final and tenth Wimbledon final. He was seeking a record eighth Wimbledon title, which would rank him above Pete Sampras, who won the tournament seven times. Djokovic, a winner of eight Grand Slams, was appearing in his 17th Grand Slam final and fourth Wimbledon final. He was seeking his third Wimbledon title and looking to defend his win of the previous year.

Build-up

This was a rematch of the previous year's final where Djokovic had won in five sets. Federer had shown strong form in the tournament. He had reached the semi-final against Andy Murray losing just one set and completed all his previous rounds with less than ten hours spent on the court. In the semi-final, he beat Murray in straight sets to set up his opportunity for a record 8th Wimbledon and 18th Grand Slam win. On the other half of the draw, Djokovic had barely survived after a scare of a fourth round elimination against Kevin Anderson whom he beat from two sets down. Djokovic had also recently lost in the French Open final against Stan Wawrinka, and was considered to be vulnerable at times.

Match

Djokovic won the first set, before Federer made a comeback to win the second set in a close tie-breaker, saving seven set points in the process. By the third set, however, Djokovic started to tighten his grip on the match as Federer's count of unforced errors rose. In some crucial moments, Djokovic was able to defend break points, and eventually, it became too much for Federer to sustain the challenge. In the end, Djokovic won in four sets.

Statistics

See also 

 Djokovic-Federer rivalry

References

External links
 Match details at the official ATP site
 Player head-to-head at the official ATP site

2015 Wimbledon Championships
Novak Djokovic tennis matches
Roger Federer tennis matches
2015